Ait Said is a small town and rural commune in Essaouira Province of the Marrakech-Tensift-Al Haouz region of Morocco. At the time of the 2004 census, the commune had a total population of 7081 people living in 1342 households.

References

External links
http://mapcarta.com/17463930

Populated places in Essaouira Province
Rural communes of Marrakesh-Safi